The killer ape theory or killer ape hypothesis is the theory that war and interpersonal aggression was the driving force behind human evolution. It was originated by Raymond Dart in the 1950s; it was developed further in African Genesis by Robert Ardrey in 1961.

According to the theory, the ancestors of humans were distinguished from other primate species by their greater aggressiveness, and this aggression remains within humanity, which retains many murderous instincts.

The theory gained notoriety for suggesting that the urge to do violence was a fundamental part of human psychology. The hunting hypothesis is often associated with the theory, because of similarities and because Robert Ardrey developed both. However, both chimpanzees and bonobos have been observed to exhibit aggressive behaviors over 100 times more often than humans.

Overview 
The theory has variations as to what kind of violence served as the evolutionary catalyst: one-on-one aggression or group-based aggression.

The theory suggests  the primary reason humans evolved bipedalism was to conserve energy after learning how to run, and to free up the use of upper limbs. The killer ape theory posits that violence was a driving factor in evolving bipedalism, with violence motivating the use of upper limbs to wield weapons.

In Creatures of Cain: The Hunt for Human Nature in Cold War America by Erika Lorraine Milam (2018), she states that , "in the 1970s, the theory unraveled altogether when primatologists discovered that chimpanzees also kill members of their own species." The fact that chimpanzees attack their own species raises questions about if interpersonal violence derives from biological or social factors.

Summary 
The expression "killer ape" does not mean an outstandingly aggressive kind of ape; in fact, the term refers to anthropological analysis of human aggression. Accordingly, the killer ape is a notably belligerent species on which our instincts might be rooted, because this very ancestor could establish itself due to its special aggression.

Raymond A. Dart (1893–1988) originated the hypothesis in his article "The predatory transition from ape to man" (1953).

Reception 
Ethologist Konrad Lorenz showed interest in similar ideas in his book On Aggression (1963). In his introduction, he describes how rival butterfly fish defend their territories, leading him to raise the question of whether humans, too, tend to intraspecific conflict.

A 2008 article in Nature by Dan Jones stated, "A growing number of psychologists, neuroscientists, and anthropologists have accumulated evidence that understanding many aspects of antisocial behaviour, including violence and murder, requires the study of brains, genes, and evolution, as well as the societies those factors have wrought." Evolutionary psychologists generally argue that violence is not done for its own sake, but is a by-product of goals such as higher status or reproductive success. Some evolutionary psychologists argue that humans have specific mechanisms for specific forms of violence such as against stepchildren (the Cinderella effect). Chimpanzees have violence between groups, which are similar to raids and violence between human groups in nonstate societies, and produce similar death rates. On the other hand, intragroup violence is lower among humans living in small-group societies than among chimpanzees. Humans may have a strong tendency to differ between ingroup and outgroup, which affects altruistic and aggressive behavior. Also, evidence exists that both intragroup and intergroup violence were much more prevalent in the recent past and in tribal societies. This suggests that tendencies to use violence to achieve goals are affected by social mores. Reduced inequalities, more available resources, and reduced blood feuds due to better-functioning justice systems may have contributed to declining intragroup violence.

The idea that man is naturally warlike has been challenged, for example in the book War, Peace, and Human Nature (2013), edited by Douglas P. Fry. The Seville Statement on Violence, released under UNESCO auspices in 1986, specifically rejects any genetic basis to violence or warfare though is considered outdated in light of more contemporary studies. More modern research and criticism has focused on misinterpretations of fossil evidence, lack of research into other apes, and the political climate of the Cold War.

In fiction 
The association of intraspecies and interspecies violence with a quantum leap in human evolution can be seen in the opening sequence of 2001: A Space Odyssey.

The television show Sliders made extensive use of the killer ape theory in storyline arcs involving the Kromaggs.

See also 
 Congo (film)
 Gombe Chimpanzee War
 Homo Necans (1972)
 Hunting hypothesis
 On Aggression (1963)
 Returning soldier effect
 2001: A Space Odyssey (film)

References

Bibliography

External links
 "The Killer Ape Is Dead"
 Excerpts from African Genesis by Robert Ardrey

Aggression
Anthropology
Human evolution